Giovanni Marradi (1852–1922) was an Italian poet born at Livorno and educated at Pisa and Florence. At the latter place he started with others a short-lived review, the Nuovi Goliardi, which made a literary sensation. He became a teacher at various colleges, and eventually an educational inspector in Massa Carrara.

Marradi was much influenced by Carducci, and became known not only as a critic but as a charming descriptive poet, his principal volumes of verse being Canzone moderne (1870), Fantasie marnie (1881), Canzoni e fantasie (1853), Ricordi lirici (1884), Poesie (1887), Nuovi canti (1891) and Ballate moderne (1895).

He is the great-grandfather of the expressionist musician Giovanni Marradi.

References 

 

1852 births
1922 deaths
People from Livorno
Italian poets
Italian male poets